Who's Your Daddy? is an online multiplayer parody simulation video game created by Joseph Williams under the name Evil Tortilla Games. The game raised $1,500 through the crowdfunding platform Kickstarter and was approved for release on Steam through Steam Greenlight. An early access version of the game was released December 23, 2015. The full game was released on May 13, 2016.

Gameplay
The game includes a competitive multiplayer mode played either online via the game's servers or via local multiplayer in which one player controls the father and the other player controls the baby. In both modes, the father must prevent the baby's death, through methods such as locking cabinets and placing dangerous objects out of the baby's reach, as the baby attempts to commit suicide in various ways, including drinking bleach and sticking forks in electrical outlets.

The game takes place in a two-story home with several common rooms. Players often swap roles each round.

Remake 
A remake of the game was announced on the game's Steam community page on October 16, 2018. The game was announced to include several new features, as well as expanding to many other platforms. The release was delayed several times before being set to December 23, 2020, exactly five years after the original game's release. The remake was released for Microsoft Windows, MacOS, Linux, Xbox One, Android, and iOS.

References

2015 video games
Android (operating system) games
IOS games
Kickstarter-funded video games
MacOS games
Multiplayer and single-player video games
Simulation video games
Steam Greenlight games
Video game remakes
Video games developed in the United States
Virtual baby video games
Windows games
Xbox One games
Linux games